Tungsten pentoxide was reported in early literature but proved to have the stoichiometry W18O49. Sometimes called mineral blue, it is a blue solid formed by the reaction of tungsten trioxide, WO3, and tungsten metal at 700 °C.

Intermediate oxides of tungsten
There are a number of these unusual intermediate oxides formed from reacting metal and trioxide namely, W20O58, W24O70. W18O49 contains both octahedral and pentagonal bipyramidal co-ordination of the metal atoms by oxygen.

See also
Tungsten(III) oxide
Tungsten(IV) oxide
Tungsten(VI) oxide

References

Tungsten compounds
Transition metal oxides